The following is a list of FCC-licensed radio stations in the United States state of Georgia, which can be sorted by their call signs, frequencies, cities of license, licensees, and programming formats.

List of radio stations

Defunct
 WACL (570 AM)
 WAYS
 WBHB
 WBKZ (880 AM, Athens, Georgia)
 WBMQ
 WBUE-LP
 WCUG (Cuthbert, Georgia)
 WGAF (910 AM, Valdosta)
 WGHC
 WGM (radio station)
 WGPC
 WHLE-LP
 WJLG
 WJTP
 WMGA (1130 AM, Moultrie)
 WRFV
 WSEM (1500 AM, Donalsonville)]]
 WSYL
 WWGS (1430 AM, Tifton)]]

See also
 Georgia media
 List of newspapers in Georgia (U.S. state)
 List of television stations in Georgia (U.S. state)
 Media of cities in Georgia: Athens, Atlanta, Augusta, Columbus, Macon, Savannah
 Georgia Association of Broadcasters

References

Bibliography

External links

 
  (Directory ceased in 2017)

Images

 
Georgia
Radio